Dielis is a New World genus of the family Scoliidae, also known as the scoliid wasps.

Species 
Species within this genus include:
Dielis auripilis (Fox, 1896)
Dielis bahamensis (Bradley, 1964)
Dielis dorsata (Bradley, 1940) – Caribbean scoliid wasp
Dielis pilipes (Saussure, 1858) – hairy-footed scoliid wasp
Dielis plumipes (Drury, 1770) – feather-legged scoliid wasp
Dielis tolteca (Saussure, 1857) – Toltec scoliid wasp
Dielis trifasciata (Fabricius, 1793) – three-banded scoliid wasp

References

External link 

Parasitic wasps
Scoliidae
Hymenoptera genera